Petite Canouan is one of the Grenadines islands which lie between the Caribbean islands of Saint Vincent and Grenada. Politically, it is part of the nation of Saint Vincent and the Grenadines. Its area is approximately 0.15 km2. The island has wildlife refuge status and hosts Petit Canouan Wildlife Reserve.

References 

Islands of Saint Vincent and the Grenadines